The Ioffe Physical-Technical Institute of the Russian Academy of Sciences (for short, Ioffe Institute) is one of Russia's largest research centers specialized in physics and technology. The institute was established in 1918 in Petrograd (now St. Petersburg) and run for several decades by Abram Ioffe. The institute is a member of the Russian Academy of Sciences.

Present structure of the institute 
As of 2019, the Ioffe institute employed about 1500 people, around 1000 of whom were scientific researchers (including 560 with a PhD degree and 250 with a Doktor Nauk degree). 
Most of the research staff members are top graduates of the St. Petersburg (former Leningrad) universities.

From 2013 until mid-May 2018 the Ioffe institute was under formal jurisdiction of the Federal Agency for Scientific Organizations (FASO Russia), now it is under jurisdiction of the established in May 2018 Ministry of Science and Higher Education, like all other institutions of the Russian Academy of Sciences (RAS).

The institute is organized into five divisions:
 Center for Nano-Heterostructure Physics
 Solid State Electronics
 Solid State Physics
 Plasma Physics, Atomic Physics and Astrophysics
 Physics of Dielectrics and Semiconductors
Each of the divisions includes several laboratories. The institute has its own graduate school and a scientific council. There exists an intensive collaboration with the research and industrial establishments in Russia and worldwide.

The institute publishes five scientific journals: Semiconductors, Physics of the Solid State, Optics and Spectroscopy, and Technical Physics (journal + letters)).

Founding of the institute 
The foundation date of the Ioffe Institute is September 23, 1918 – the day of signing the decree on the establishment of the physical and technical department in the (established in March of the same year) State Roentgenological and Radiological Institute in Petrograd. Despite tremendous economic problems after the World War I and the October Revolution (1917), the development of science was one of the priorities of the new Communist government.

The abovementioned department was headed by A. F. Ioffe. In 1922, on its basis, the State Physicotechnical Radiology Institute has emerged. After several reorganizations and renaming, since 1933, the institute became “Leningrad Physicotechnical Institute”. The form “Physicotechnical” is a Russian variant for “Physical & Technical”. Three decades later, in the 1960s, the word “Ioffe” was added to the institute name, in honor of the first director.

Since 1939, the institute has been a member of the Academy of Sciences of the USSR (since 1991 – of the Russian Academy of Sciences). In 1967, it was awarded the Order of Lenin. These details were reflected in the institute name, especially in Russian. Also now, for historical reasons, there remained the entrance plaque (s. photo): “Academy of Sciences of the USSR, A. F. Ioffe Physicotechnical Institute, awarded the Order of Lenin”.

Presently, in English texts, for example in scientific papers, the name “[А. F.] Ioffe [Physical-Technical] Institute [of the Russian Academy of Sciences]” is used (the optional fragments are enclosed in square brackets).

Main scientific achievements 
The Ioffe Institute is considered the cradle of Soviet physics. Such outstanding scientists as L. D. Landau, P. L. Kapitsa started their career here, many physicists — among them Y. B. Zeldovich, I. V. Kurchatov, I. E. Tamm — have worked at the institute for some time.

The research of the institute covers nearly all fields of the contemporary physics, including the solid-state, semiconductors, quantum electronics, astrophysics, plasma, fluid dynamics, cosmology, nuclear synthesis.

More than 100 employees of the institute were recognized by awarding the highest prizes and orders of the Soviet Union and of Russia – in particular the Lenin and State Prizes of the USSR, State Prizes of Russia, Government prizes and special prizes of the Soviet/Russian Academy of Sciences.

Twice, the Nobel Prize was awarded for the works performed at the Ioffe Institute. In 1956, academician N. N. Semyonov (together with C. N. Hinshelwood) got the Nobel Prize in Chemistry for a discovery and study of chain reactions: the works were made and published in 1927, when N. N. Semyonov was a staff member of the institute. In 2000, Zh. I. Alferov, director of the Ioffe Institute at that time, became a Nobel Prize laureate in Physics (together with H. Kroemer and J. Kilby) for the development of semiconductor heterostructures for high-speed optoelectronics.

The Ioffe Institute has played a central role in the development of photovoltaic solar power in Russia and internationally, and thus in the development of renewable energy.

Buildings 
The main building of the Ioffe Institute (s. photo at the top of the article and the very left part of the photo below) is located at Polytechnicheskaya Street, 26. It was built in a Neoclassicism style in 1912–1916 by the architect G. D. Grimm and served as "a refuge for the elderly needy hereditary noblemen in commemoration of the 300th anniversary of the Romanovs' house" at the forty-prized ones, on the second floor they arranged Church (now the Small Assembly Hall of the institute).

In 1920 the building was adapted to the institute by the design of civil engineers P. I. Sidorov and Yu. V. Bilinsky. The ceremonial transfer of the building to the institute took place on February 4, 1923. Until 1953, the apartment of A. F. Ioffe was located in the same building. In the years 1927–1928 there appeared a yard part, and in 1970 the building was reconstructed and expanded along Kurchatov Street.

Beyond this historical building, a more modern building on another side of the Kurchatov Street (the right part of the photo) also belongs to the Ioffe Institute. It was constructed in the 1970s. Furthermore, some laboratories of the Ioffe Institute are placed in Shuvalovo, a north-west outskirts of St. Petersburg.

In front of the main facade are the busts of Abram Ioffe (sculptor G. D. Glickman, 1964) and Boris Konstantinov (sculptor Mikhail Anikushin, 1975).

Directors of the institute 
Before 1950 – Abram Ioffe
 1950-1957 – A. P. Komar
 1957-1967 – Boris Konstantinov
 1967-1987 – Vladimir M. Tuchkevich
 1987-2003 – Zhores Alferov
 2003-2017 – A. G. Zabrodskii
 January–September, 2018 – Sergei V. Lebedev (acting)
 Since October, 2018 – Sergei V. Ivanov (bis July 2019 acting, since August 2019 official)

Notable people associated with the institute 

 Hasan Abdullayev
 Anatoly Alexandrov
 Zhores Alferov 
 Artem Alikhanian
 Abraham Alikhanov
 Arkady Aronov
 Lev Artsimovich
 Matvei Bronstein
 Victor Bursian
 Yuri Denisyuk
 Edward Drobyshevski
 Vladimir G. Dubrovskii
 Alexei L. Efros
 Oleg Firsov
 Georgy Flyorov
 Yakov Frenkel
 Andrei Fursenko
 George Gamow
 Igor Grekhov
 Vladimir Gribov
 Evgeni Gross
 Abram Ioffe
 Pyotr Kapitsa 
 Yulii Khariton
 Boris Konstantinov
 Yury Kovalchuk
 Igor Kurchatov
 Georgii Kurdyumov
 Lev Landau 
 Vladimir Lobashev
 Nikolay Semyonov 
 Lev Shubnikov
 Dmitri Skobeltsyn
 Yuri Trushin

References

External links 
 

Physics institutes
Research institutes in Saint Petersburg
Research institutes in the Soviet Union
1918 establishments in Russia
Institutes of the Russian Academy of Sciences
Nuclear research institutes in Russia
Nuclear technology in the Soviet Union
Cultural heritage monuments in Saint Petersburg